is the 9th single by NMB48. It was released on March 26, 2014. It debuted in number one on the weekly Oricon Singles Chart. It was the third best-selling single in March and it was the 9th best-selling single of the year, as of June 18. It has sold a total of 451,335 copies. It reached number one on the Billboard Japan Hot 100. It was the 15th best-selling single of the year in Japan, with 451,335 copies.

Background 
This single will be released in 4 versions: Type A, Type B, Type C and Theater Edition. The title song was first performed during NMB48 Team N's stage on March 7, 2014. This single includes all members except Rena Shimada, who was graduating, and Tsubasa Yamauchi who was on a hiatus due to her injury. This is Mayu Ogasawara's last single.

Track list

TYPE-A

TYPE-B

TYPE-C

Theater Edition

Members

Takane no Ringo 
Team N: Mayu Ogasawara, Riho Kotani, Kei Jonishi, Miori Ichikawa, Miru Shiroma, Sayaka Yamamoto, Akari Yoshida, Miyuki Watanabe
Team M: Sae Murase, Yui Takano, Airi Tanigawa, Fuuko Yagura, Nana Yamada
Team BII: Yūka Kato, Shu Yabushita
Kenkyuusei: Nagisa Shibuya

Isshukan, Zenbu ga Getsuyoubi nara ii no ni... 
Kenkyuusei: Natsuko Akashi, Yuumi Ishida, Mizuki Uno, Mai Odan, Chihiro Kawakami, Nagisa Shibuya, Momoka Shimazaki, Eriko Jo, Riko Takayama, Honoka Terui, Hiromi Nakagawa, Reina Nakano, Rurina Nishizawa, Chiho Matsuoka, Megumi Matsumura, Arisa Miura, Ayaka Morita, Rina Yamao

Prom no Koibito 
Team N: Kanako Kadowaki, Rika Kishino, Haruna Kinoshita, Sayaka Yamamoto
Team M: Ayaka Okita, Ayaka Murakami, Fuuko Yagura, Natsumi Yamagishi
Team BII: Akari Ishizuka, Anna Ijiri, Emika Kamieda
Kenkyuusei: Mai Odan

Mizukiri 
Team N: Rina Kondo, Yuuki Yamaguchi, Miyuki Watanabe
Team M: Rena Kawakami, Momoka Kinoshita, Mao Mita, Nana Yamada, Keira Yogi
Team BII: Konomi Kusaka, Rina Kushiro
Kenkyuusei: Arisa Miura, Rina Yamao

Yama e Ikou 
Team N: Miru Shiroma, Aika Nishimura, Momoka Hayashi
Team BII: Hono Akazawa, Yuuri Ota, Kanako Muro
Kenkyuusei: Chihiro Kawakami, Reina Nakano

Kasa wa Iranai 
Team N: Narumi Koga
Team M: Yuki Azuma, Rena Shimada
Team BII: Mirei Ueda, Hazuki Kurokawa, Saki Kono, Rikako Kobayashi, Tsubasa Yamauchi
Kenkyuusei: Natsuko Akashi, Yuumi Ishida, Mizuki Uno, Momoka Shimazaki, Eriko Jo, Riko Takayama, Honoka Terui, Hiromi Nakagawa, Rurina Nishizawa, Chiho Matsuoka, Megumi Matsumura, Ayaka Morita

References 

2014 singles
2014 songs
Japanese-language songs
NMB48 songs
Oricon Weekly number-one singles
Billboard Japan Hot 100 number-one singles
Song articles with missing songwriters